Paragapostemon is a monotypic genus of bees belonging to the family Halictidae. The only species is Paragapostemon coelestinus.

The species is found in Central America.

References

Halictidae
Monotypic Hymenoptera genera